The 2016 Arkansas Democratic presidential primary took place on March 1 in the U.S. state of Arkansas as one of the Democratic Party's primaries ahead of the 2016 presidential election.

On the same day, dubbed "Super Tuesday," Democratic primaries were held in ten other states plus American Samoa, while the Republican Party held primaries in eleven states including their own Arkansas primary.

Opinion polling

Results

Primary date: March 1, 2016
National delegates: 69

Analysis
Arkansas, the state where Hillary Clinton served as First Lady during her husband Bill Clinton’s tenure as governor, gave Clinton one of her largest victories during the course of the Democratic Primary. She swept the state among every major demographic – gender, race, income, and educational attainment. According to exit polls, 67 percent of voters in the Arkansas Democratic Primary were white and they opted for Clinton by a margin of 62–35 compared to the 27 percent of African Americans who backed Clinton by an even larger  margin of 91–6.

After his landslide defeat, the Sanders campaign reported that Hillary Clinton had notched wins in southern states including Arkansas because Bernie Sanders did not compete with her, although this claim was widely debunked.

See also
 2016 Arkansas Republican presidential primary

References

Arkansas
Democratic primary
2016
March 2016 events in the United States